By Myself may refer to:

 By Myself (Hitomi album), 1996
 By Myself (Julie London album), 1965
 "By Myself" (1937 song), written by Arthur Schwartz and Howard Dietz, introduced in the musical Between the Devil
 "By Myself", a song by Aretha Franklin from Aretha (with the Ray Bryant Combo)
 "By Myself", a song by Leonard Nimoy from Two Sides of Leonard Nimoy
 "By Myself", a song by Linkin Park from Hybrid Theory
 Lauren Bacall by Myself, reprinted as By Myself and Then Some, an autobiography by Lauren Bacall
 By Myself, 1977 album by Abdul Wadud

See also 
 All By Myself (disambiguation)